All Stars is a South African football club based in Cape Town.

The club was founded as Cape Town All Stars in 2010, and played their home games at the Athlone Stadium. They dissolved after selling their National First Division league status to then third tier TS Galaxy in 2018. In 2020 they bought back their status from TS Galaxy, who in turn bought their way into the PSL by purchasing the status from Highlands Park.

Relocation and renaming
The club relocated from Cape Town to Johannesburg at the start of the 2022–23 season, and were renamed All Stars F.C.

Seasons

Current squad

References

External links
 
 Premier Soccer League

Soccer clubs in South Africa
SAFA Second Division clubs
National First Division clubs